Arnus may refer to:
Arno, known in Latin as Arnus, a river in Italy
Arnus Vallis, a valley on Mars
an alter ego of the DC comics superhero Icon
 SS Arnus, a Spanish ship shipwrecked in 1921

See also 
 Arnos
 Arnas (disambiguation)